Ex Stasis is a public art work created by American artist Richard Lippold and located on the campus of Marquette University in downtown Milwaukee, Wisconsin. The abstract sculpture is a series of angular metallic planes set on a concrete pedestal. It is located near Marquette's Haggerty Museum of Art, but used to be the centerpiece of the west courtyard of the Alumni Memorial Union.

References

Outdoor sculptures in Milwaukee
1988 sculptures
Steel sculptures in Wisconsin
Aluminum sculptures in Wisconsin
Marquette University
1988 establishments in Indiana
Abstract sculptures in Indiana